Vauxhall is a suburb of the North Shore of Auckland, New Zealand. Alison Park lies directly to the west, separating Vauxhall from Lake Road, which carries the majority of traffic between Takapuna and Devonport. Vauxhall is included in the Narrow Neck census area.

History
The suburb gets its name from the Vauxhall Gardens established here by pioneer settler William Cobley in the 1870s. These in turn were named after the Vauxhall Gardens in London, some of the gardeners of which were brought out to New Zealand. Cobley had bought the  "Cheltenham" estate in 1869, behind what is now known as Cheltenham Beach.

Vauxhall was a constituent suburb of the Borough of Devonport until 1989, when the Borough disappeared in local body reorganisation and became part of the newly created North Shore City. In 2010, North Shore City was itself amalgamated into Auckland Council.

Education

References

External links
 Vauxhall School website
 Photographs of Vauxhall held in Auckland Libraries' heritage collections.
Suburbs of Auckland
North Shore, New Zealand
Populated places around the Hauraki Gulf / Tīkapa Moana